Ross Cameron Stewart (born 10 April 1995) is a Scottish footballer who plays as a goalkeeper for Heart of Midlothian.

Career

Motherwell 
Stewart is a graduate from the Motherwell youth system and was in direct competition with first-team back-up goalkeeper Lee Hollis for a place on the bench during the 2012-13 season.

On 12 May 2013, Stewart made his first-team debut from the bench, replacing goalkeeper Darren Randolph in a 2–0 win versus Ross County.

Albion Rovers 
In June 2015, Stewart signed for newly promoted Scottish League One club Albion Rovers from Coatbridge, after being released by the Fir Park club.

St Mirren 
On 24 May 2017, after two years at Cliftonhill, Stewart signed a two-year deal with St Mirren. One of his team-mates at both Cliftonhill and St Mirren Park was another Ross Stewart, a striker who later played for Ross County.

Livingston 
In July 2018, Stewart signed for Livingston and on 4 May 2019, debuted for the Lions in a 1–1 draw versus St Johnstone at McDiarmid Park.

Queen of the South (loan) 
On 23 January 2020, Stewart was loaned out to Dumfries club Queen of the South until 31 May 2020. On 8 February, Stewart faced two penalties against Bob McHugh in the Doonhamers league match at Cappielow versus Greenock Morton in a 2–2 draw, conceding the first in the 59th minute, then saving the second in the 67th minute.

Hearts (loan) 
On 13 August 2020, Stewart signed a six-month loan deal with Heart of Midlothian until January 2021. On 22 January 2021, the loan was extended for the remainder of the 2020-21 season.

Hearts 
On 4 May 2021, Stewart signed a pre-contract agreement with Hearts, securing a two year contract.

Career statistics

References

External links
 
 

1995 births
Living people
Footballers from Glasgow
Scottish footballers
Association football goalkeepers
Motherwell F.C. players
Albion Rovers F.C. players
St Mirren F.C. players
Livingston F.C. players
Queen of the South F.C. players
Heart of Midlothian F.C. players
Scottish Premier League players
Scottish Professional Football League players
Scotland youth international footballers